David Thomas Bosset (August 25, 1944 – August 3, 2009) was a promoter of tax evasion schemes, including the 861 argument. He himself refused to withhold for taxes. He was the subject of a permanent injunction prohibiting him from engaging in further 861 advocacy. He founded Bosset Marketing Partners, Inc.

See also

References 

American people convicted of tax crimes
1944 births
2009 deaths
Tax protesters in the United States